Strange Seas and Shores: a Collection of Short Stories is a collection of science fiction and fantasy short stories, written by Avram Davidson. It was first published in hardcover by Doubleday in 1971. A paperback edition was issued by Ace Books in August 1981, and an ebook edition by Gateway/Orion in September 2013.

Summary
The book collects seventeen novelettes and short stories, originally published in various magazines, with a preface by the author and an introduction by the American author Ray Bradbury.

Contents
"Preface"
"Introduction: Night Travel on the Orient Express Destination: Avram" (Ray Bradbury)
"Sacheverell"
"Take Wooden Indians"
"The Vat"
"The Tail-Tied Kings"
"Paramount Ulj"
"A Bottle Full of Kismet"
"The Goobers"
"Dr. Morris Goldpepper Returns"
"The Certificate"
"Ogre in the Vly"
"Après Nous"
"Climacteric"
"Yo-Ho, and Up"
"The Sixty-Third Street Station"
"The House the Blakeneys Built"
"The Power of Every Root"
"The Sources of the Nile"

Reception
The collection was reviewed by James R. Newton in Son of the WSFA Journal #32, James Blish in The Magazine of Fantasy & Science Fiction, December 1971, Charles N. Brown in Locus #102, December 10, 1971, Locus #104, January 14, 1972, and Locus #248, September 1981, Paul Walker in Luna Monthly #40, September 1972, David A. Truesdale in Science Fiction Review, Spring 1982, and Tom Easton in Analog Science Fiction/Science Fact, March 29, 1982.

Notes

1971 short story collections
Short story collections by Avram Davidson
Science fiction short story collections
Fantasy short story collections
Doubleday (publisher) books